April's Coming (Finnish: Huhtikuu tulee) is a 1953 Finnish comedy film directed by Valentin Vaala and starring Ossi Elstelä, Tuija Halonen and Kurt Ingvall.

Cast
 Ossi Elstelä as Subeditor
 Tuija Halonen as Journalist
 Kurt Ingvall as Jaakko Huhtikuu
 Hilkka Kinnunen as Annikki Teräs  
 Rauno Kuosmanen as Pertti Avovirta
 Harry Lewing as Jopi
 Tarmo Manni as Kiuru - artist  
 Kerstin Nylander
 Rauha Rentola as Elisabet Avovirta  
 Joel Rinne as Heikki Avovirta  
 Anja Räsänen as Kaija Avovirta
 Emma Väänänen 
 Mika Waltari as Man in a restaurant

References

Bibliography 
 Qvist, Per Olov & von Bagh, Peter. Guide to the Cinema of Sweden and Finland. Greenwood Publishing Group, 2000.

External links 
 

1953 films
1953 comedy films
Finnish comedy films
1950s Finnish-language films
Films based on works by Mika Waltari
Films directed by Valentin Vaala
Finnish black-and-white films